There are several lists of counties of Quebec, that are list articles listing counties for the jurisdictions of Quebec.

 List of former counties of Quebec; for counties, pre-1990, in the territory that is now the Canadian province of Quebec
 List of regional county municipalities and equivalent territories in Quebec; for county-equivalents, post-1980s, in the territory of the Canadian province of Quebec

Counties
Local government in Quebec
Counties, list